MasterChef is an American competitive cooking reality television series that premiered on Fox on July 27, 2010. Based on the British series of the same name and produced by Endemol Shine North America and One Potato Two Potato, the series features amateur and home chefs competing to win the title of 'MasterChef'. The current line-up of judges consists of Gordon Ramsay, Joe Bastianich, and Aarón Sánchez.

A twelfth season, subtitled Back to Win, aired May–September 2022. In September 2022, the series was renewed for a thirteenth season. The season is set to premiere in summer 2023 with Ramsay, Sánchez, and Bastianich all set to return as judges.

Format
MasterChef is based on the British BBC series MasterChef. The competition takes place in the MasterChef soundstage located in Los Angeles, CA which includes a large kitchen area with several cooking stations which is overlooked by a balcony, a well-stocked pantry, a freezer/fridge area and a fine-dining restaurant/seating dining area room used for certain challenges.

While the particular format of the season has slightly varied over the years, the following challenges have all been regularly featured:

 Skills Test: Cooks are challenged to perform a list of common cooking techniques or styles, or to replicate a particular cooking method of a dish (i.e. steaks done to an exact wellness). This type of test is also sometimes used as an Elimination Test.
 Mystery Box: Cooks are all given a box with the same ingredients and must use only those ingredients to create a dish within a fixed amount of time. The judges will select three dishes based on visual appearance and technique alone to taste, and from these three select one winner who usually gains an advantage of some type in the elimination test.
 Elimination Test: After the challenge is explained, judges evaluate all dishes based on taste and visual appeal. The judges nominate the worst dishes for elimination and criticize them before eliminating at least one contestant.
 Team Challenge: The cooks are split into teams by either team captains or the judges. They often occur in a restaurant takeover or pop-up restaurant taking the place of the staff of a particular restaurant. Diners taste both meals and vote for their favorite. The winning team advances, while the losing team will participate in the Pressure Test or face elimination based on the teams' performance.
 Pressure Test: Another form of the Elimination Test, in which losing team members compete against each other to make a standard dish within a very limited amount of time that requires a great degree of cooking finesse. Each dish is judged on taste, visual appeal and technique, and the losing chef is eliminated.

Once the competition is reduced to either the final two or three competitors, the finalists will compete against each other in a three-course cook-off. All courses of the meal are judged and an overall winner is crowned. The winner of each season wins $250,000, a MasterChef trophy, and the title of MasterChef. Some seasons have also added other prizes such as a cookbook deal.

Judges 

Notes

For the first five seasons, the series starred celebrity chefs Gordon Ramsay (the co-creator of the series and Hell's Kitchen), Graham Elliot and restaurateur Joe Bastianich. From seasons six through eight, pastry chef Christina Tosi temporarily replaced Bastianich. On season seven, Elliot departed as a judge, and in place of a third judge, there were a series of guest judges, one of which was Aarón Sánchez. Since season eight, Sánchez joined as a regular judge. In season nine, Bastianich returned as a regular judge, replacing Tosi.

Series overview

Specials 
Note: Bold indicates the winner(s) of the challenge.

MasterChef Celebrity Showdown (aired January 18, 2016)
Ta'Rhonda Jones vs Kaitlin Doubleday from Empire (Mystery Box Challenge)
Boris Kodjoe and Nicole Ari Parker vs Terry Crews and Rebecca Crews (Cupcake Tag Team Challenge)
Gigi Hadid vs Devon Windsor (Supermodel Signature Dish Face-off)
Christine Hà, Luca Manfé, and Claudia Sandoval vs Addison Osta Smith, Zac Kara, and Amaya Baéz (Champions vs Juniors)

MasterChef Celebrity Showdown (aired January 2, 2017)
Cheryl Hines vs Kal Penn (Mystery Box Challenge)
Trai Byers and Grace Gealey vs NeNe and Gregg Leakes (Tag Team Challenge)
Ronde Barber and Tiki Barber vs. Joel Madden and Benji Madden (Pastry Challenge)
Anthony Anderson and Chef Gordon Ramsay vs. Jordana Brewster and Chef Christina Tosi (Mystery Box Team Challenge)
Guest judges: Season seven winner Shaun O'Neale and MasterChef Junior season five contestants: Shayne Wells and Justise Mayberry.

MasterChef Celebrity Family Showdown (aired May 15, 2019 and May 22, 2019)
Johnny Weir and his brother Boz vs. Tara Lipinski and her husband Todd (Fish Dish Showdown)
Lisa Vanderpump and her daughter Pandora vs. Nicole "Snooki" Polizzi and JWoww (Blind Taste Test)
Tori Spelling and her daughter Stella vs. Jennie Garth and her daughter Fiona (Home Fridge Swap Challenge)
Evander Holyfield and his daughter Ebonne vs. Oscar De La Hoya and his daughter Atiana (Keeping Up with Gordon Match)

Broadcast

Season one aired as a summer series initially on Tuesday nights at 9:00p.m. ET, debuting on July 27, 2010; it later moved to Wednesday nights at 8:00p.m. ET on August 18.

On September 7, 2010, MasterChef was renewed for a second season, which started with a two-night premiere on June 6, 2011.

On October 6, 2011, MasterChef was renewed for a third season, which started with a two-night premiere on June 4, 2012, following Hell's Kitchen.

On July 23, 2012, MasterChef was renewed for a fourth season, which premiered on May 22, 2013.

On May 10, 2013, Fox renewed MasterChef for an additional two seasons, which extended the show to at least six seasons.

On July 22, 2015, Fox renewed MasterChef for a seventh season.

On September 19, 2018, it was announced that the series had been renewed for a tenth season, which premiered on May 29, 2019 with Ramsay, Sánchez, and Bastianich returning as judges.

On August 18, 2021, the series was renewed for a twelfth season, which premiered on May 25, 2022.

On September 14, 2022, it was announced that Fox renewed the series for a thirteenth season, prior to the airing of the twelfth season's finale later that same day. The season is set to premiere in summer 2023.

Reception

Critical
The premiere episode received mixed reviews from major newspapers and online review websites, with reviews commenting that it was entertaining, but criticized the emotional aspect. The Los Angeles Times claimed the contestants' back stories were "blown up," which referred to their dramatization. A Reuters reviewer explained the show "manages to be hugely entertaining and involving thanks mainly to the judges’ personalities and the ability of the producers to spot emotionally charged stories." The Globe and Mail said "the contrived sentimentality of it is, frankly, vomitous" referring to the emotion in contestants' reactions.

The program also attracted negative attention in season two when Agence France-Presse journalist Alex Ogle discovered that the producers doctored a crowd scene said to be of "thousands upon thousands lined up" to audition for the program. In post-production, portions of the scene were replicated so as to make the crowd look larger than it actually was, as evidenced by multiple appearances by especially noticeable people in the scene.

In 2018, season three auditionee Jessie Glenn discussed her experiences becoming a contestant, something she was uniquely able to do because it was overlooked that she had never returned the nondisclosure contract which all applicants are required to sign. She revealed what she described as a carefully planned campaign by the show's staff to create emotional reactions for the sake of on-air drama which caused long-term emotional distress for many contestants, a situation she said was common to most American reality television; she called the casting process "sadistic prying" to assess contestants' weaknesses and vulnerabilities and decide how best to pit contestants against one another to "cause friction and distress". Glenn also revealed that One Potato Two Potato, Ramsay's production company, assessed a 15% "management fee" on contestant earnings.

Ratings

Earlier American adaptation

West 175 Productions produced an earlier American adaptation, MasterChef USA, broadcast on PBS from 2000 to 2001. The series format was based directly on BBC's MasterChef and lasted 28 episodes over two seasons. It was hosted by British chef Gary Rhodes, who hosted the UK version of MasterChef in 2001.

Kitchenware
In 2011, Reveille Productions and Shine TV, announced licensing deals with kitchenware manufacturers The Cookware Company, Triple Loop Housewares, Global Knives, and Kidsline to produce MasterChef-branded cookware, including stainless steel pans, knives, kitchen appliances, and children's cooking sets. The branded products were given to contestants on the television show to use during challenges. The show changed its branding in 2013 to reflect its expanded focus on consumer products in addition to the television shows. In 2018, Shine America hired Brand Central as their licensing agency, and more branded products, including barbecue tools from Unibrands and children's cooking sets from Wicked Cool Toys, were announced.

See also

 MasterChef Junior

References

External links

 
 

 
2010 American television series debuts
English-language television shows
Fox Broadcasting Company original programming
MasterChef
Television series by Reveille Productions
Television series by All3Media
Television shows featuring audio description
Cooking competitions in the United States
2010s American cooking television series